Live 1976–1977 is the sixth album of the bassist Stanley Clarke. This is his first live album.

Track listing
All tracks composed and arranged by Stanley Clarke
 "School Days" — 7:01 
 "Lopsy Lu" — 7:25 
 "Quiet Afternoon" — 6:51
 "Silly Putty" — 5:37
 "Dayride" — 7:04
 "Bass Folk Song No. 3" — 13:41
 "The Magician" — 5:55
 "Desert Song" — 7:29
 "Vulcan Princess" — 3:22

Tracks 1-4 recorded at the Roxy Theatre, Los Angeles, California, September 1977
Track 5 recorded at Hammersmith Odeon, London, June 1977
Tracks 6, 7, 9 recorded at Arlington Theater, Santa Barbara, California, December 1976
Track 8 recorded at Electric Lady Studios, New York City, June 1976

Personnel
Stanley Clarke - electric bass guitar, acoustic bass, piccolo bass
 Gerry Brown — drums
 Ray Gomez — electric guitar
 Al Harrison — trumpet, flügelhorn, piccolo trumpet, slide whistle
 Munyungo Jackson — percussion
 Bob Malach — tenor saxophone, flute
 John McLaughlin — acoustic guitar
 Peter Robinson — organ, ARP string ensemble, Fender Rhodes, Mini-Moog bass
 David Sancious — piano, Mini-Moog, Poly Moog, Fender Rhodes, organ
 James Tinsley — trumpet, flügelhorn, piccolo trumpet, alarm clock
 Alfie Williams — soprano, alto and baritone saxophones, flute

Production

 David Coleman — art direction	
 Henry Diltz — photography	
 Bernie Grundman — mastering	
 Dan Humann — engineer, mixing	
 Gary Ladinsky — engineer	
 Steve Sykes — mixing	
Bruce Talamon — photography
 Ed Thacker — engineer

References

Stanley Clarke live albums
1977 live albums
Epic Records live albums
Albums recorded at the Roxy Theatre